Patrick Allen Ramsey (born February 14, 1979) is a former American football quarterback. He played college football for the Tulane Green Wave and was drafted by the Washington Redskins in the first round of the 2002 NFL Draft. Ramsey has also been a member of the New York Jets, Denver Broncos, Tennessee Titans, Detroit Lions, New Orleans Saints, Jacksonville Jaguars, Miami Dolphins, and Minnesota Vikings.

Early life
Ramsey was born on February 14, 1979, in Ruston, Louisiana. He attended Ruston High School, where he was a two-year starter quarterback, and was also state champion in the javelin throw.  His best friend was the son of Bert Jones, a Ruston native who had gone on to a distinguished career as an NFL quarterback, and the elder Jones became Ramsey's mentor.

College career
Ramsey attended Tulane University and had an outstanding collegiate career as a "scholar athlete", being named five times to the Conference USA Commissioner's honor roll, and was the National Football Foundation/College Football Hall of Fame Scholar-Athlete of the Year, in 2001.

During Ramsey's 1999 season, he set 20 Tulane passing records, including single season records for passing yards, attempts, and completions. In that season he threw for 25 touchdowns, the second-most ever for a Tulane player.  In 2000, he led the third-best passing offense in the nation. He also made the All-Conference USA second-team, leading the conference in most meaningful passing statistics. In his senior season in 2001 he started 11 games and threw for 22 touchdowns. He set a school record, having at least one touchdown pass in 31 consecutive games. Upon graduating, he had the top five passing games in school history. His career totals at Tulane were surpassed only (in various individual statistics, none overall) by Shaun King, Mike McKay, Roch Hontas, and Terrence Jones.

Ramsey graduated with degrees in accounting and finance.

Professional career

Washington Redskins

Ramsey was drafted 32nd overall in the 2002 NFL Draft by the Washington Redskins, to replace Tony Banks as quarterback.

On October 13, 2002 the Redskins hosted the team from Ramsey's home state, the New Orleans Saints. Ramsey threw four interceptions as the Saints won 43–27.

The 2003 season, Ramsey's first full season as a starter was even more difficult. He was one of the most sacked quarterbacks in the NFL that year, which was also Spurrier's last season as head coach. In 2004, Joe Gibbs returned to coach the team after a prolonged absence; he originally traded for Mark Brunell as the starting quarterback (and then quickly signed him to a long term extension) but replaced him with Ramsey in November. A month later, Gibbs named Ramsey as the starting quarterback for the 2005 season.

In the Redskins' first game against the Chicago Bears, Ramsey suffered a minor neck injury after a clothesline hit by Chicago Bears linebacker Lance Briggs. Gibbs demoted Ramsey to the role of Brunell's back-up for the second game versus the Dallas Cowboys. It was reported that Ramsey requested a trade from the Redskins, following announcement of his demotion. This report was later claimed to be false by Ramsey and the Redskins organization.

New York Jets
In March 2006, Ramsey was traded to the New York Jets for a 6th round pick in the 2006 NFL Draft. After failing to earn the starting quarterback position from incumbent Chad Pennington, he was cut after the 2006 season. He only threw a single pass for the Jets.

Denver Broncos
Following the season, Ramsey signed with the Denver Broncos, serving as the backup to starter Jay Cutler. He was released in the beginning of free agency in March 2009.

Tennessee Titans
Ramsey signed a one-year contract with the Tennessee Titans on April 3, 2009, serving as the third quarterback on the depth chart after Kerry Collins and Vince Young. He was released on October 3 when cornerback Cary Williams was activated from the practice squad.

Detroit Lions
Ramsey was signed by the Detroit Lions on December 26, 2009 after quarterback Matthew Stafford was placed on injured reserve.

New Orleans Saints
Ramsey signed a one-year contract with the New Orleans Saints on July 28, 2010; he was projected to serve as a veteran backup for the Saints' starting quarterback, Drew Brees, filling the role vacated by Mark Brunell who was not re-signed after the 2009 season. On September 3, Ramsey was released as part of final cuts before the start of the 2010 NFL season, with Chase Daniel having won the backup spot.

Jacksonville Jaguars
Due to the Jacksonville Jaguars' quarterback injury problems in early 2010, Ramsey was brought on as a potential temporary backup for the team. He was released from the team shortly after on October 29, 2010.

Miami Dolphins
On November 15, 2010 it was reported that he was signed by the Miami Dolphins following injuries to Chad Pennington and Chad Henne. He was released on waivers November 30, 2010.

Minnesota Vikings
On December 15, 2010, Ramsey signed a contract with the Minnesota Vikings but did not play any games that year and was not on the Vikings' 2011 roster.

Personal life
Ramsey married his wife, Virginia, on April 13, 2002, the week before the 2002 NFL Draft.  The couple has two daughters, Virginia and Jane.  He and his wife had their third child in the fall of 2011, Grey.

References

External links

1979 births
Living people
Sportspeople from Ruston, Louisiana
Players of American football from Louisiana
American football quarterbacks
Tulane Green Wave football players
Washington Redskins players
New York Jets players
Denver Broncos players
Tennessee Titans players
Detroit Lions players
New Orleans Saints players
Jacksonville Jaguars players
Miami Dolphins players
Minnesota Vikings players